Maria Orwid (23 July 1930 – 9 February 2009) was a Polish psychiatrist and pioneer of Child and Family psychiatry and of Family therapy in Poland. She was a professor of the Jagiellonian University. As a survivor of the Holocaust, she contributed to the literature.

References and notes

1930 births
2009 deaths
Child psychiatrists
Developmental psychologists
Family therapists
Academic staff of Jagiellonian University
20th-century Polish Jews
Polish psychiatrists
Jewish psychiatrists
Polish women psychiatrists